The following television stations broadcast on digital or analog channel 15 in Canada:

 CFGC-DT-2 in North Bay, Ontario
 CFTO-TV-21 in Orillia, Ontario
 CFVS-DT in Val-d'Or, Quebec
 CHCH-DT in Hamilton, Ontario
 CIII-DT-12 in Sault Ste. Marie, Ontario
 CIVK-DT in Carleton, Quebec
 CIVQ-DT in Quebec City, Quebec
 CKMI-DT-1 in Montreal, Quebec

15 TV stations in Canada